Elections to Cannock Chase District Council took place on 5 May 2016. This election was held on the same day as other local elections as well as Police and Crime Commissioner elections.  A total of 13 councillors were elected from all but two of the council's wards as a third of the council was up for election.

The Labour Party held control of the council with a slightly reduced majority of one compared with their tally following the previous election. Labour lost one seat of their 2012 election total but held all of the other seats they were defending, albeit many with reduced majorities.

The Conservative Party won the highest number of seats and votes at the previous election but did not make any net gains on their 2012 result. They did, however, regain a seat in Hawks Green which was held by a former Conservative councillor who had defected to UKIP. This left the Conservatives with 13 seats on the council, confirming their status as the official opposition party. UKIP failed to match their 2014 success and did not win any seats at this election.

The Liberal Democrats only fielded two candidates, both in former areas of strength for them in Rugeley. Although one of these wards went to a recount, they did not manage to regain any of the losses they suffered in 2012. Meanwhile, the Green Party once again stood candidates in every ward and made a surprise gain in the Hednesford South ward, ousting a sitting Labour councillor and giving them their first representation on Cannock Chase District Council. Unlike previous years, there are no independent candidates.

Results

|}

Council Composition
Prior to the election, the composition of the council was:

After the election, the composition of the council was:

Ward results
Vote share changes are based on the results achieved by parties in 2012 when these seats were last contested.

Brereton and Ravenhill

Cannock East

Cannock North

Cannock South

Cannock West

Etching Hill and the Heath

Hagley

Hawks Green

^ Anne Bernard was the sitting councillor for the Hawks Green ward and previously defected from the Conservatives to UKIP.

Heath Hayes East and Wimblebury

Hednesford North

Hednesford South

Norton Canes

Western Springs

References

2016 English local elections
2016
2010s in Staffordshire